Salamgarh, officially Islamgarh, is an old city and now a neighbourhood in Jalalpur Jattan. It is situated to the south of the old city of Jalalpur Jattan.

History 
There exist remnants of a fort believed to be built by Chandragupta Maurya in 300 BC. The original name of the village could not be ascertained but the fort became famous as Islamgarh Fort with the passage of time. The fort of Islamgarh had remained under Aurangzeb Alamgir, Ahmed Shah Abdali, and Ranjit Singh and their forces.

References 

Populated places in Gujrat District
Maurya Empire
Towns in Gujrat District
Archaeological sites in Punjab, Pakistan